Kitiona Villiamu (born Wellington, 27 September 1980) is a New Zealand-born Samoan rugby union player. He played as lock and flanker.

Career
He first played for Samoa in a test against Ireland, at Lansdowne Road, on 11 November 2001. He was part of the 2003 Rugby World Cup roster, where he played four matches as substitute. His last international cap was against Scotland, at Wellington, on 4 June 2004. In his club career, he played for Counties Manukau in the NPC between 2001 and 2003, and in 2003 he moved to Manchester R.F.C.

References

External links
 
 G. Kitiona Viliamu at New Zealand Rugby History

1980 births
Living people
Rugby union players from Wellington City
Samoan rugby union players
Samoan people of New Zealand descent
Samoan expatriates in the United Kingdom
Rugby union flankers
Rugby union locks
Samoa international rugby union players